Geula Even-Sa'ar ( Even, ; born 15 June 1972) is an Israeli journalist and a former anchor on Israeli radio and television.

Media career
Geula Even-Sa'ar hosted Good Morning Israel and Yoman on Channel 1 and was one of the main newscasters on Channel 11 (Kan).

In 2018, Even resigned her job as news anchor prior to the political come-back of her husband. In 2021 she went on unpaid leave from Channel 11 ahead of Israel's national elections.

Personal 
In 2013 Geula Even married Israeli politician Gideon Sa'ar. They had two children together. She has three children from a previous marriage.

See also
Women of Israel
Israeli media

References

Israeli women journalists
Israeli television news anchors
1972 births
Israeli television journalists
Israeli radio journalists
People from Haifa
Living people